FC Frederick is an association football team playing in the NPSL (National Premier Soccer League). They joined the NPSL in 2015 and play their home games at Thomas Athletic Field on the campus of Hood College in Frederick, Maryland. The team used Urbana High School in Ijamsville, Maryland as a home facility for the 2019 season.

Roster

References

External links
Official site
NPSL official site

National Premier Soccer League teams
Sports in Frederick, Maryland